Awakenings: New Magic in 2057 is a 1995 role-playing game supplement for Shadowrun published by FASA.

Contents
Awakenings: New Magic in 2057 is a supplement dedicated entirely to magic and is intended to give an insight into the way people of the Sixth World see magic, as well as detailing the new developments.

Reception
Andy Butcher reviewed Awakenings: New Magic in 2057 for Arcane magazine, rating it a 7 out of 10 overall. Butcher comments that "The result is a strange combination of different bits and pieces. Awakenings is still a good solid supplement, though, and will prove useful for all types of campaigns."

References

Role-playing game supplements introduced in 1995
Shadowrun supplements